Melitara prodenialis is a moth of the family Pyralidae described by Francis Walker in 1863. It is native to North America, where it is known from south-eastern New York to Florida along the Atlantic coastal plain, and west to eastern Oklahoma and north-central and south-eastern Texas. It is an introduced species in Hawaii. It is a special concern species in Connecticut. 

There are two generations per year throughout most of its range, but three generations in Florida. Adults are on wing from June to July and from September to October in Arkansas.

The larvae feed on Opuntia cladodes.   Larvae are gregarious within the cladode, and may feed in several cladodes to complete development.

Pupation occurs in a silken cocoon on the surface of the soil under a dead cladode or other debris.

References

External links
Images
Species info
Bug Guide

Moths described in 1863
Phycitini